Palais des sports de Toulon, also known as Palais des sports Jauréguiberry  is an indoor sporting arena located in Toulon, France. The capacity of the arena is 4,200 people. It is currently the home of the Hyères-Toulon Var Basket basketball team. It hosted the preliminary rounds of the 2007 World Women's Handball Championship.

References

Handball venues in France
Indoor arenas in France
Basketball venues in France
Sport in Toulon
Sports venues in Var (department)
Buildings and structures in Toulon